1907 in Argentine football saw Alumni regain the Argentine championship winning its 7th Primera División (First Division) title in eight seasons.

The relegation system is established since this season. Barracas AC withdrew after 7 fixtures and was disaffiliated by the Association.

Primera División

The 1907 championship featured eleven teams, with each team playing the other twice.

Final standings

Lower divisions

Primera B
Champion: Nacional (Floresta)

Primera C
Champion: Atlanta

Domestic cups

Copa de Honor Municipalidad de Buenos Aires
Champion: Belgrano AC

Final

Copa de Competencia Jockey Club
Champion: Alumni

Final

International cups

Tie Cup
Champion:  Alumni

Final

Copa de Honor Cousenier
Champion:  Belgrano AC

Final

Argentina national team
Argentina retained both Copa Lipton and Copa Newton in 1907.

Copa Lipton

Final

Copa Newton

Final

References

 
Seasons in Argentine football